William H. Cross is an American mountain climber. In May 2006 he summited Mount Everest.

He has ascended the highest peaks on all seven continents and walked to both the North and South Poles. He has also led expeditions to 15 unmapped, unexplored mountains in Greenland and also in Patagonia, Mountains of the Moon, the Sahara Desert, and the Thar Desert of India.

Cross has lived with type 1 diabetes for over 30 years.

He earned a Bachelor of Arts from Allegheny College, a Master of Science in Education from Duquesne University, and Secondary Principal's Certification from the University of Pittsburgh, where he specialized in educational programs for troubled teens. Will, his wife Amy, and their 6 children live in Pittsburgh, Pennsylvania.

He is a member of the American Alpine Club, Royal Geographical Society, Explorers Club, and the American Mountain Guides Association. He received a Gold Congressional Award for exemplary service to the United States, granted for his initiative, achievement, and service.

Summits
Some examples:
2011 Manaslu
2009 Cho Oyu
Summited Mount Everest: May 23, 2006

He made headlines for attempting to summit Everest in 2005 despite having to deal with Type one diabetes, and he had also tried to summit in 2004. However, on these first two expeditions he did not reach the summit even though he did learn about mountaineering and Mount Everest.

Other peaks he has summited:
Aconcagua
Vinson Massif
Kilimanjaro
Denali (Mount McKinley)
Kosciuszko

See also
List of Mount Everest summiters by number of times to the summit
List of Mount Everest records
Geri Winkler

Sources
 David Templeton (2008). Pittsburgh Post-Gazette: Adventurer with diabetes prepares for another mountain climb. Retrieved March 31, 2008.

References

External links
 Will Cross website

Year of birth missing (living people)
Living people
Duquesne University alumni
Sportspeople from Pennsylvania
University of Pittsburgh alumni
People with type 1 diabetes